The Music Technology Group (MTG) is a research group of the Department of Information and Communication Technologies of the Universitat Pompeu Fabra, Barcelona. It was founded in 1994 by its current director, Xavier Serra, and it specializes in sound and music computing research.

Ongoing research

The research of the MTG is quite close to the core of the Sound and Music Computing interdisciplinary; combining strengths in basic disciplines, such as Signal Processing, Machine Learning and Human Computer Interaction while being able to apply other disciplines/technologies in order to approach music related application-driven problems. Current active topics include:

 Audio signal processing: focusing on spectral modeling for sound synthesis and transformations.
 Sound and Music description: focusing on semantic analysis and classification of audio signals.
 Musical and Advanced Interaction: focusing on table-top interfaces for musical creation and exploration.
 Sound and Music communities: focusing on social networking technologies for sound and music applications.

Educational activities

The MTG is very active in educational activities within the UPF and in collaboration with the ESMUC. Here is a list of the main academic degrees in which the researchers of the MTG are involved with

 PhD in Sound and Music Computing  at the UPF
 Master in Sound and Music Computing  at the UPF
 Master in Sonology, collaboration between UPF and ESMUC
 Bachelor's degree in Audiovisual Systems Engineering at the UPF
 Bachelor's degree in Computer Engineering  at the UPF
 Bachelor's degree in Sonology  at the ESMUC

See also
 Sound and music computing

References

Pompeu Fabra University
Music technology
Organizations established in 1994
1994 establishments in Spain